Keith Harper may refer to:
Keith Harper (footballer), Australian rules footballer
Keith Harper (lawyer), American ambassador to the United Nations Human Rights Council